Alfredo "Papo" Alejandro Carrión (born November 11, 1948) is a Puerto Rican politician and the current mayor of Juncos. Alejandro is affiliated with the Popular Democratic Party (PPD) and has served as mayor since 2001.

Early years and studies

Alfredo Alejandro Carrión was born in Juncos, Puerto Rico on November 11, 1948. He is the second of five children, born to Elisa Carrión Cosme and Obdulio Alejandro Rivera.

After his Military service, Alejandro completed a Bachelor's degree in Business Administration from the University of Turabo.

Political career

Alejandro was first elected as mayor of Juncos at the 2000 general election. After that, he has been reelected five times (2004, 2008, 2012, 2016, 2020).

Personal life

Alejandro was married to Medelicia Peña Ortiz, until her death on October 31, 2018. They had four children together: Lizette, Kelvin, Kenia and Avilio.

References

External links
Alfredo Alejandro Profile on WAPA-TV

Living people
1948 births
Mayors of places in Puerto Rico
People from Juncos, Puerto Rico
Popular Democratic Party (Puerto Rico) politicians
United States Army soldiers